Vasum pufferi is an extinct species of medium to large sea snail, a marine gastropod mollusk in the family Turbinellidae.

Description

References

 Emerson, W.K. 1964 - Results of the Puritan-American Museum of Natural History Expedition to Western Mexico; 20. The Recent MollusksS: Gastropoda: Harpidae, Vasidae and Volutidae; . American Museum of Natural History. Novitates, No 2202
 E. J. Petuch. 1988. Neogene History of Tropical American Mollusks 1-217

External links
 

pufferi
Gastropods described in 1964